Mekhela Sador is a traditional Assamese sarong traditionally worn by Assamese women. 

There are two main pieces of cloth that are draped around the body.

Draping
The bottom portion, draped from the waist downwards, is called the mekhela. It is a wide cylindrical piece cloth that is folded into one or two pleats to fit around the waist and tucked in.  The pleats are folded to the right and are typically fewer in number as opposed to the pleats of Saree, which are folded to the left and have multiple pleats. Strings are never used to tie the mekhela around the waist, though an underskirt with a string is often used. 

The top portion of the two-piece dress, called the chador (pronounced: Sador), is a long piece of cloth that has one end tucked into the upper portion of the mekhela above the belly button and the rest is draped around the chest and back. The other end of the chador is tucked in the belly after making a few pleats.  A fitted blouse is often worn with Mekhela chador. Traditionally, in the past, another garment called riha was worn as a chador or as an inner piece below the chador. A riha is still worn as part of the Assamese bridal trousseau and sometimes seen people wearing in indigenous traditional events like Bihu and other Assamese festivals.
Ornamental designs on the mekhela-chadors are traditionally woven, never printed.  Sometimes a woven pattern called the paari, is stitched along the sides of a chador, or along the bottom of a mekhela. The patterns include motifs of animals, birds, human forms, flowers, diamond, and celestial phenomenon. These indigenous patterns are woven by tribal and nontribal Weavers. The motifs are known as phul. The bright-hued diamond motifs representing fine workmanship is a typical and traditional feature of the textiles of Assam. In Pat and Muga silk, delicate designs of flowers and creepers while bold motifs of geometric shapes are typically found in Eri and Cotton.

Material
Traditional mekhela chadors are made from the following materials:
 Cotton
 Muga
 Pat silk
 Eri silk
Some modern low-budget sets are also made with varying blends of cotton and muga or pat silk with synthetic materials.

Availability
The mekhela chador is available in many stores across Guwahati and other cities of Assam. They are also available through various websites.
The demand for pure pat is very high among customers. Mekhela Chador of Pat and polyester are dominating the market. But the demand of Muga, ‘golden silk of Assam' is low due to its high price and availability of substitutes like tassar which look very similar to the original Muga silk.

External links
 How to wear a Mekhala Chadar: The traditional Assamese attire
 
 About Mekhela Chador (Mekhla Sador)

See also

Riha
Muga
Pathin
Textiles and dresses of Assam
Textile manufacturing terminology
Culture of Assam

References

Indian clothing
Textiles and clothing of Assam
Dresses